Sir John Maclean, 4th Baronet of Duart and Morvern (1670–1716) was the 20th Clan Chief of Clan Maclean from 1674 to 1716. He was the 16th and last Laird of Duart, when in 1691 he lost Castle Duart to Archibald Campbell, 1st Duke of Argyll. The castle wasn't recovered by Clan Maclean until 1912 until it was purchased by Fitzroy Donald Maclean, 221 years later.

Biography
He was born in 1670. He became chief at the death of his father, Sir Allan Maclean, 3rd Baronet, in 1674, when he was four years old. Lauchlan Maclean, 2nd Laird of Brolas, and Lachlan Maclean, 3rd Laird of Torloisk were assigned as his legal guardians. In 1691 Castle Duart was under siege by Archibald Campbell, 1st Duke of Argyll, and Maclean was forced to surrender it.

He commanded the right wing of the Jacobite army at Battle of Killiecrankie, and held out in Cairnburgh Castle, which straddles Cairn na Burgh Mòr and Cairn na Burgh Beag. In 1692 he made his peace with William III of England. He afterwards went to France and remained at the Château de Saint-Germain-en-Laye until the Act of Indemnity 1703, when he returned to Scotland. He joined John Erskine, 6th Earl of Mar in the Battle of Sheriffmuir, and after retired to Gordon Castle where he died in March 1716.

Marriage and children
He married Mary, daughter of Sir Aeneas Macpherson of Invereshie and had:
Sir Hector Maclean, 5th Baronet
Katherine Maclean

Ancestors

References

1670 births
1716 deaths
John
People of the Jacobite rising of 1715
Baronets in the Baronetage of Nova Scotia